Norfork School District is a public school district based in Norfork, Arkansas, United States. The school district encompasses  of land including all of Norfork and portions of several Baxter County communities including Briarcliff, and Salesville.

The district provides comprehensive education for kindergarten through grade 12, is accredited by the Arkansas Department of Education (ADE), and its high school is also accredited by AdvancED since 2002.

History 
On July 1, 1993, Tri-County School District was disestablished with territory given to multiple districts, including Norfork.

Schools 
 Norfork High School, serving more than 200 students in grades 7 through 12.
 Arrie Goforth Intermediate School, serving more than 212 students in kindergarten through 6th grade

References

Further reading
These include maps of predecessor districts:
 (Download)

External links 
 

School districts in Arkansas
Education in Baxter County, Arkansas